Sierra del Divisor is a mountain range located in the border between Peru and Brazil, rising up from the Amazonian plain. In 2015, a 3.3 million-acre area of rainforest in the mountain range was designated as a national park by the Peruvian government.

References

Divisor
Divisor
Landforms of Peru
Landforms of Acre (state)
Brazil–Peru border
Divisor